The Church of St Mary, also known as Lowgate St Mary, is a Church of England parish church in Kingston upon Hull, East Riding of Yorkshire. The church is a grade II* listed building.

History
The church dates to the 15th-century. A tower was added in 1697. The church was restored from 1861 to 1863 by Sir George Gilbert Scott.

Though formerly an evangelical parish, the parish was influenced by the 19th-century Oxford Movement. The organ was built by Brindley & Foster and dates to 1904. A Temple Moore-designed rood screen was added to the chancel in 1912.

On 13 October 1952, the church was designated a grade II* listed building.

Present day
The parish of St. Mary Hull is in the Archdeaconry of the East Riding of the Diocese of York.

The church continues to use the Book of Common Prayer for its services, rather than the more modern Common Worship.

Notable people
 The Rt Revd Richard Wood, formerly Suffragan Bishop of Damaraland, served as Vicar from 1977 to 1979
Richard Justice (died 1757), composer and organist at St Mary's Church, Hull

Gallery

References

External links

 Church website

Church of England church buildings in the East Riding of Yorkshire
Grade II* listed churches in the East Riding of Yorkshire
Churches in Kingston upon Hull
Anglo-Catholic church buildings in the East Riding of Yorkshire